The Northwestern State Lady Demons basketball team is the women's basketball team that represents Northwestern State University in Natchitoches, Louisiana. The team currently competes in the Southland Conference. The head coach is Anna Nimz.

History

The Lady Demons first season was 1974–75.  As of the end of the 2013–14 season, the team had an overall record of 716–462.  Northwestern State, a member of the Southland Conference from 1987 to 1988, has an overall SLC record of 284–170 as of the end of the 2013–14 season.

The Lady Demons have appeared in four NCAA Division I tournaments (1989, 2004, 2014, 2015).  The team has also appeared in the WNIT four times (1986, 1993, 1995, and 1999). The team appeared in the 2016 WBI.  The Lady Demons have won three Southland Conference regular season titles (1995, 1999, 2004) and three Southland Conference tournament titles (2004, 2014, and 2015).

Roster

NCAA tournament results

References

External links